The Presbytery of Egoli is a presbytery based in Johannesburg, South Africa. It stretches from Randfontein and Kagiso to Edenvale and from Midrand to Mulbarton. There are 29 congregations.

References

External links
 

Presbyterian denominations in Africa
Presbyteries and classes